Rocky Fork Creek is a stream in Boone County in the U.S. state of Missouri. It is a tributary to Perche Creek. Rocky Fork Creek was named for the limestone deposits near a fork in the watercourse. The Rocky Fork Lakes Conservation Area is named after the stream.

See also
List of rivers of Missouri

References

Rivers of Boone County, Missouri
Rivers of Missouri